The 2023 Hobart International was a women's tennis tournament played on outdoor hard courts. It was the 28th edition of the Hobart International and part of the WTA 250 tournaments of the 2023 WTA Tour. It took place at the Hobart International Tennis Centre in Hobart, Australia from 9 to 14 January 2023. This was the first event since 2020, after a two-year absence following the 2021 and 2022 editions had been cancelled due to the COVID-19 pandemic.

Champions

Singles

  Lauren Davis def.  Elisabetta Cocciaretto 7–6(7–0), 6–2

Doubles

  Kirsten Flipkens /  Laura Siegemund def.  Viktorija Golubic /  Panna Udvardy 6–4, 7–5

Points and prize money

Point distribution

1 Points per the WTA.

Singles main draw entrants

Seeds

1 Rankings as of 2 January 2023.

Other entrants
The following players received wildcards into the singles main draw:
  Olivia Gadecki
  Talia Gibson
  Sofia Kenin
  Sloane Stephens

The following player received entry using a special exempt:
  Ysaline Bonaventure

The following players received entry using a protected ranking into the singles main draw:
  Jaqueline Cristian
  Laura Siegemund
  Patricia Maria Țig

The following players received entry from the qualifying draw:
  Anna Blinkova
  Lauren Davis 
  Tereza Martincová 
  Nuria Párrizas Díaz 
  Maryna Zanevska 
  Tamara Zidanšek 

The following player received entry as a lucky loser:
  Wang Xinyu

Withdrawals 
  Danka Kovinić → replaced by  Wang Xinyu
  Wang Xiyu → replaced by  Tatjana Maria

Doubles main draw entrants

Seeds 

1 Rankings as of 2 January 2023.

Other entrants 
The following pairs received wildcards into the doubles main draw:
  Latisha Chan /  Alexa Guarachi
  Olivia Gadecki /  Talia Gibson

Withdrawals 
  Alicia Barnett /  Olivia Nicholls → replaced by  Alicia Barnett /  Monica Niculescu
  Makoto Ninomiya /  Alycia Parks → replaced by  Vivian Heisen /  Makoto Ninomiya

References

External links

 
Hobart International
Hobart International
Hobart International
Hobart International